Leonard Rossiter (21 October 1926 – 5 October 1984) was an English actor. He had a long career in the theatre but achieved his highest profile for his television comedy roles starring as Rupert Rigsby in the ITV series Rising Damp from 1974 to 1978, and Reginald Perrin in the BBC's The Fall and Rise of Reginald Perrin from 1976 to 1979.

Early life and stage work
Rossiter was born on 21 October 1926 in Wavertree, Liverpool, the second son of John and Elizabeth (née Howell) Rossiter. The family lived over the barber's shop owned by his father. He was educated at the Liverpool Collegiate School (1939–46). In September 1939, when the Second World War began, Rossiter was evacuated, along with his schoolmates, to Bangor in north Wales, where he stayed for 18 months. While at school, his ambition was to go to university to read modern languages and become a teacher; however, his father, who served as a voluntary ambulanceman during the war, was killed in the May Blitz air raid in 1941. Rossiter then had to support his mother, therefore he could not take up the place he had been offered at the University of Liverpool. Instead, he completed his National Service as a sergeant, initially in the Intelligence Corps, then in the Army Education Corps, spending much of the time in Germany writing letters home for other soldiers. After being demobbed he worked for six years as an insurance clerk in the claims and accident departments of the Commercial Union Insurance Company.

Rossiter started acting after his actress girlfriend challenged him to try it, after he had scoffed at the performances of the amateur group she was in. He joined the Wavertree Community Centre Drama Group and made his first appearance with the Adastra Players in Terence Rattigan's Flare Path. The local critic said that he "was particularly outstanding, his one fault being a tendency to speak too fast on one or two occasions". He gave up his insurance job to enrol in Preston repertory theatre and became a professional actor at the age of 27. He made his professional stage debut in Joseph Colton's The Gay Dog in Preston on 6 September 1954.

He later became assistant stage manager there, and then went on to Wolverhampton and Salisbury repertory companies. In his first 19 months in the business he played some 75 roles. He said later: "There was no time to discuss the finer points of interpretation. You studied the part, you did it and then you studied the next part. I developed a frightening capacity for learning lines. The plays became like Elastoplast, which you just stuck on and then tore off. It was the perfect preparation for rehearsing situation comedy on television at the rate of one episode a week."

In 1957–58, he played in the musical Free as Air and then toured in Eugene O'Neill's The Iceman Cometh. He joined the Bristol Old Vic and was there for two years, from 1959 to 1961, a time he described as "the bedrock of his career", followed by other stage work, in, among other plays, The Strange Case of Martin Richter, Disabled, The Heretic, The Caretaker and Semi-Detached (in New York). His performance in the premiere of Michael Blakemore's stage production of Bertolt Brecht's The Resistible Rise of Arturo Ui in 1969 met with critical acclaim.

Film and television career
Rossiter soon established himself as a character actor in films and television, as well as on stage. He stated: "I think I sensed fairly early on that I was not physically or facially built in the way that would ever fit even remotely into heroic or what used to be called juvenile parts. I always played character parts - right from the start." His first film role was in A Kind of Loving (1962). In Billy Liar (1963) he played the title character's boss. His first major television role was as Detective-Inspector Bamber in the long-running police television series Z-Cars. He also had guest roles in series as diverse as The Avengers ("Dressed to Kill", 1963) and Steptoe and Son ("The Lead Man Cometh", 1964; "The Desperate Hours", 1972). Among his early film credits were four films directed by Bryan Forbes, namely King Rat (1965), The Wrong Box (1966), The Whisperers (1967), and Deadfall (1968).

In 1968, he played Mr Sowerberry in the film version of Lionel Bart's musical Oliver! and took one of the few speaking supporting roles in 2001: A Space Odyssey as the Russian scientist Smyslov. He worked with Stanley Kubrick again in Barry Lyndon (1975), in the role of Captain John Quin. He appeared opposite Peter Sellers in The Pink Panther Strikes Again (1976) as Superintendent Quinlan. In 1968, he appeared in Nigel Kneale's television play The Year of the Sex Olympics, an episode of BBC 2's Theatre 625, one of his four appearances in the series.

In Rising Damp, on ITV, Rossiter played Rupert Rigsby, the lecherous landlord of a house converted into shabby bedsits, reprising the role from the successful stage version, The Banana Box. While he was in Rising Damp he also took the lead role in The Fall and Rise of Reginald Perrin, adapted by David Nobbs from his own comic novels and broadcast on the BBC. Rossiter was given a surprise tribute on This Is Your Life in 1975. He appeared in I Tell You It’s Burt Reynolds, an episode of the 1977 Yorkshire Television series The Galton & Simpson Playhouse, as well as the short films The Waterloo Bridge Handicap (1978), and the Galton and Simpson-scripted Le Pétomane (1979). After his portrayal of Reginald Perrin, Rossiter's non-comedy roles on television became less frequent, although there were exceptions, such as a debt collector in the one-off HTV thriller Machinegunner (1976), and Frank Harris in Fearless Frank, or Tit-bits from the Life of an Adventurer (1978), a BBC Play of the Week.

From 1978 to 1983, Rossiter performed in ten commercials for Cinzano. The series of adverts was created by film director Alan Parker and, at Rossiter's suggestion, used an old music hall joke where he spills a drink over his wife, played by Joan Collins. In the Channel 4 programme The 100 Greatest TV Ads (2000) Terry Lovelock, the director of two of the commercials, said that Rossiter used to refer jokingly to Collins as "The Prop".

Rossiter reprised Rigsby for a film version of Rising Damp in 1980, thus achieving the distinction of playing the same role on stage, television, and film. He continued to make a steady stream of film appearances, including a role in Lindsay Anderson's Britannia Hospital (1982). His last television role was as the supermarket manager in another ITV sitcom, Tripper's Day (1984).

He performed comic monologues in The Green Tie on the Little Yellow Dog, which was recorded 1982, and broadcast by Channel 4 in 1983.

Rossiter also played the title role in the BBC Television Shakespeare production of The Life and Death of King John (1984). His last film appearance was in Water (1985).

Radio and voice work
In the animated adaptation of The Perishers (1979), Rossiter provided the voice for Boot the dog. He narrated an abridged version of the Charles Dickens book A Christmas Carol, which was released on cassette in 1979. He appeared on the BBC Radio 4 show Desert Island Discs in 1980. In 1981, he hosted an episode of the BBC Radio 4 show With Great Pleasure in which he recited some of his favorite poetry and prose alongside his wife, Gillian Raine, and his friend, the actor James Grout. Also in 1981, he narrated a seven-part series of satirical five-minute monologues, written by Barry Pilton for BBC Radio 3, titled In a Nutshell, followed in 1982 by a second series, also written by Barry Pilton, this time comprising 8 five-minute monologues. Rossiter narrated a three-part series of the children's story Harlequin and Columbine for Story Teller magazine in 1984. He voiced the King of Hearts in two episodes of Anglia Television's version of Alice In Wonderland, which was broadcast in April 1985, six months after Rossiter's death.

Writing
Rossiter displayed his acid wit in two books: The Devil's Bedside Book (1980), a collection of cynical dictionary definitions in the style of Ambrose Bierce's The Devil's Dictionary, and The Lowest Form of Wit, (1981), a collection of biting bons mots, stinging retorts, insults and sarcasm illustrated with cartoons by Martin Honeysett. He also wrote the introduction to cook Keith Floyd's 1981 book Floyd's Food.

Personal life
Rossiter's first marriage was to the actress Josephine Tewson, with whom he had worked many times in repertory theatre in the 1950s. The marriage ended in divorce in 1961. His second wife was the actress Gillian Raine, with whom he had a daughter, Camilla, and to whom he was still married at the time of his death. Rossiter had met Raine when he played the lead role of Fred Midway in David Turner's play Semi-Detached, in a production directed by Tony Richardson. The play opened on 8 June 1962 at the Belgrade Theatre in Coventry and ran for a week. During the play's second run at the Belgrade, in September 1963, the couple fell in love and moved in together, but they did not marry until 1972.

Rossiter was an Everton fan. He was also a wine connoisseur, and converted his attic into a sort of wine cellar.

After his death, it was revealed that during the early 1980s Rossiter had had a five-year relationship with the broadcaster Sue MacGregor. His wife had not been aware of the affair until she received a letter from MacGregor breaking the news that her memoirs, which were about to be published, would include an account of the affair.

Since his childhood, Rossiter had been an enthusiastic and capable sportsman in football, cricket, tennis and later squash.

Death
On 5 October 1984, Rossiter died from hypertrophic cardiomyopathy while waiting to go onstage at the Lyric Theatre, London, where he was performing in Joe Orton's play, Loot. His funeral took place at St. Mary's Church, The Boltons, London. A memorial service was held on 15 November 1984 at St Paul's, Covent Garden. Attendees included Rossiter's Loot castmates, as well as Derek Nimmo, Fulton Mackay, and Ned Sherrin. Loot director, Jonathan Lynn, gave a eulogy in which he said of Rossiter: "Now that Leonard is up there, things had better be properly managed: I hope that the Heavenly Gates opened on cue and that the Choir of Angels is singing in tune. They had better be professional in Paradise. Because, if not, they'll certainly hear about it from Leonard."

Legacy and tributes
Rossiter was posthumously nominated for a Laurence Olivier Award for "Comedy Performance of the Year," for his role as Inspector Truscott in Loot.

In 1985, the book Leonard Rossiter by author Robert Tanitch was published. The book featured a collection of rare photos and reminiscences from friends and colleagues of Rossiter's.

In 2000, the ITV biography series The Unforgettable broadcast an episode about Rossiter's life. His wife and daughter were interviewed, as well as former colleagues, including Don Warrington, Joan Collins, and Sue Nicholls.

A biography of Rossiter, titled Leonard Rossiter: Character Driven was published in 2010 by author Guy Adams.

TV and film appearances

Theatre

Awards and nominations

References

Further reading
Tanitch, Robert (1985), Leonard Rossiter, Robert Royce Ltd. 
Adams, Guy (2010), Leonard Rossiter: Character Driven, Aurum Press Ltd. 
Lynn, Jonathan (2011), Comedy Rules: From the Cambridge Footlights to Yes Prime Minister, Faber and Faber.

External links

 Performances listed in the Theatre Archive University of Bristol
 LeonardRossiter.com: Authorised Web Site

1926 births
1984 deaths
20th-century British Army personnel
20th-century English male actors
British male comedy actors
English male film actors
English male stage actors
English male television actors
Intelligence Corps soldiers
Male actors from Liverpool
People educated at Liverpool Collegiate Institution
Royal Army Educational Corps soldiers